The Henderson County Courthouse, built in 1913, is an historic 3-story redbrick Classical Revival style courthouse building with full basement located  at 100 East Tyler Street in Athens, Texas. The courthouse has been designated as a Recorded Texas Historic Landmark since 2002. Designed by L. L. Thurman, who also previously designed the Jeff Davis County Courthouse in Fort Davis, it is unusual for its angled wings. It also has a central cupola which is not seen in most images, but there is no rotunda under the cupola. It is Henderson County's fourth courthouse and the second in Athens. The first one was built in 1850 in Buffalo, now a ghost town,  and the second was built in 1861 in Centerville, which is also a ghost town today.  The third courthouse was built in Athens in 1887.

See also

List of county courthouses in Texas

References

External links

Buildings and structures in Henderson County, Texas
County courthouses in Texas
Neoclassical architecture in Texas
Government buildings completed in 1913
1913 establishments in Texas
Recorded Texas Historic Landmarks